Albert Bielschowsky ([bi:lšofski]; 3 January 1847 – 21 October 1902) was a German literary historian (Literaturwissenschaftler). He is known for his writings concerning Johann Wolfgang von Goethe.

Bielschowsky was born in Namslau (Namysłów), Prussian Silesia, into a family of Jewish merchants. He studied philology in Breslau (Wrocław) and Berlin. Because Bielschowsky's work on Goethe was cut short by his death in Berlin, the series was completed by Theobald Ziegler.

Literary works 
Goethe. Sein Leben und seine Werke, 2 vols. Munich: C. H. Beck'sche Verlagsbuchhandlung. 1895–1903 (numerous printings).
The Life Of Goethe: 1749–1788, From Birth To The Return From Italy
The Life of Goethe: 1788–1815, from the Italian Journey to the Wars of Liberation
The Life of Goethe: 1815–1832, from the Congress of Vienna to the Poet's Death

References

External links 
 Bielschowsky, Albert at www.ostdeutsche-biographie.de

1847 births
1902 deaths
Jewish historians
German literary historians
Silesian Jews
University of Breslau alumni
Humboldt University of Berlin alumni
Johann Wolfgang von Goethe
People from the Province of Silesia
People from Namysłów